Events in the year 2017 in Gabon.

Incumbents
 President: Ali Bongo Ondimba
 Prime Minister: Emmanuel Issoze-Ngondet

Events

14 January-5 February – Gabon hosted the 2017 Africa Cup of Nations.
29 July – scheduled date for the Gabonese legislative election, 2017

Deaths
26 April – Moïse Brou Apanga, footballer (b. 1982)

References

 
Years of the 21st century in Gabon
Gabon
Gabon
2010s in Gabon